The Black Banksia Falls is a waterfall that is located within the Kanangra-Boyd National Park in the Central Tablelands region of New South Wales, Australia.

See also

 List of waterfalls of New South Wales

References

Waterfalls of New South Wales